Twelve is a 2010 teen crime drama film directed by Joel Schumacher from a screenplay by Jordan Melamed, based on Nick McDonell's 2002 novel of the same name. The film follows a young drug dealer whose luxurious lifestyle falls apart after his cousin is murdered and his best friend is arrested for the crime. It stars Chace Crawford, Rory Culkin, Curtis Jackson, Emily Meade, and Emma Roberts.

The film was produced by Gaumont Film Company and Radar Pictures and premiered at the Sundance Film Festival on January 29, 2010, and was released theatrically on August 6, 2010. It grossed $110,238 during its opening weekend and $2.6 million worldwide, against a budget of $5 million. It received negative reviews and has a 3% approval rating based on 30 votes on Rotten Tomatoes.

Plot
On the Upper East Side, White Mike, once a wealthy, carefree teenager, now struggles to scrape out a living as a marijuana dealer; he deals to his former classmates. His mother died a year earlier, her treatment consuming his family's wealth and leaving Mike emotionally scarred. Mike's friend, Molly, does not know he is a drug dealer. Mike's supplier, Lionel, sells addictive drug cocktail "Twelve" to Mike's cousin, Charlie. Being unable to pay for the drug, Charlie attempts to mug Lionel, but Lionel shoots Charlie as well as an innocent observer, Nana. Hunter, a friend of Mike and Charlie's, is taken into custody for the murders.

Several other young residents of this wealthy Manhattan scene are introduced at a party as customers of White Mike, including Tobias, Yvette, Sara, Jessica and the party's host, Chris. Jessica tries Twelve for the first time, leading to an addiction. During the party, Chris' older brother, Claude, a sociopath and weapon collector, returns home after breaking out of rehab. Their mother discovers this and threatens to call the police. Sara manipulates Chris into throwing a huge birthday party for her, just before the end of spring break. She and her friends invite everyone they know in order to make Sara's birthday "famous".

Out of drugs and money, Jessica asks Lionel to stop by Sara's party so she can buy more Twelve. Tobias meets Molly during a drug deal with Mike, and invites her to Sara's party. Mike sees this, and calls him to get him away from Molly. Mike meets up with her, where she tells him about Tobias and the party. Molly suggests visiting Mike at his job, which Mike denies before running off. Molly decides to go to the party.

As the party starts, Claude locks himself in his room, practising with his weapons. Lionel arrives, but is furious with Jessica, as she does not have the money she promised. Since she has no money, she first offers him oral sex, then to have sex with him, which Lionel agrees. Mike's father calls him to deliver the news that Charlie is dead, his body identified. Mike tries to call Molly, who does not answer her phone. He goes to the party to locate her, but is stopped by several drunk party-goers. He accidentally stumbles upon Jessica and Lionel having sex.

Startled, Lionel  begins to draw out a gun, which Mike recognizes as Charlie's. As Mike begins to accuse Lionel of the murder, Lionel shoots him, causing Claude to pull out his weapons and begin shooting up the party. Teenagers rush out of the party, but many others are killed, including Lionel. Claude hears police sirens and runs outside to die in a suicide by cop fashion. As Sara lies dying, her last thought is how this will make her famous. Mike wakes up in the hospital and Molly reprimands him for his drug-dealing livelihood. He wants to call her when he is sent home, but she says no. Mike visits Nana's mother, and together they connect over their shared grief. Mike comes to terms with his mother's death.

Cast

Release
Twelve premiered at the 2010 Sundance Film Festival.

The film opened on August 6, 2010, and earned a domestic total of $183,920 in a release of a mere two weeks. The film grossed $2,299,357 in foreign territories, adding up to $2,483,277. Based on an estimated $5 million budget, the film is a box office bomb.

Critical reception
The film received largely negative reviews, currently holding a 3% rating on review aggregator website Rotten Tomatoes, based on 30 reviews. On Metacritic, the film has a 22/100 rating based on 13 critics, indicating "generally unfavorable reviews".

The film has been referred to as "the worst movie in the history of Sundance". In his review in The New York Times, Stephen Holden writes:

Home media
The film was released on DVD on December 28, 2010.

References

External links
 
 
 
 
 

2010 films
2010 crime drama films
2010 independent films
2010s teen drama films
American crime drama films
American independent films
American teen drama films
2010s English-language films
Films about drugs
Films about interracial romance
Films about virginity
Films based on American novels
Films directed by Joel Schumacher
Films scored by Harry Gregson-Williams
Films set in New York City
Films shot in Los Angeles
Films shot in New York City
French crime drama films
English-language French films
French independent films
French teen drama films
Teen crime films
2010s American films
2010s French films